Men's Super G World Cup 1985/1986

This was the first ever Super G World Cup.

Calendar

Final point standings

In Men's Super G World Cup 1985/86 all 5 results count.

World Cup
FIS Alpine Ski World Cup men's Super-G discipline titles